M.DIA was a footwear trademark founded in 1999, in suburbs of Paris (France), by Mohamed Dia.

History
The Dia signed a license with NBA and created a textile collection NBA by Dia. 

Previously the brand was spread by Secteur Ä the rapper crew (Passi, Stomy Bugsy, les Neg’marrons and Ärsenik).

In 2005, Mohamed Dia created his own record label called Dia Entertainment. Ärsenik takes part in the project.

External links
Official Website
Stockx Kicks Site
Champs Sneakers

Shoe brands
Shoe companies of France
Products introduced in 1999
Clothing companies of France
Companies based in Île-de-France